The 2003–04 Scottish Premier League was won by Celtic.

As league champions, Celtic qualified for the UEFA Champions League, with runners-up Rangers also qualifying. Third-placed Hearts qualified for the UEFA Cup, as did Dunfermline Athletic, who took the Scottish Cup place despite losing the final to Celtic.

During the season, Celtic set a Scottish record of 25 successive wins.

Partick Thistle were relegated, and First Division winners Inverness Caledonian Thistle were promoted.

Celtic's Henrik Larsson was the top scorer with 30 goals.

Teams

Promotion and relegation from 2002–03
Motherwell finished bottom of the 2002–03 Scottish Premier League but were spared relegation, as 2002–03 Scottish First Division champions Falkirk were denied promotion due to their lack of an appropriate stadium for the Scottish Premier League.

Stadia and locations

Personnel

Managerial changes

League table

Results

Matches 1–22
During matches 1–22 each team played every other team twice (home and away).

Matches 23–33
During matches 23–33 each team played every other team once (either at home or away).

Matches 34–38
During matches 34–38 each team played every other team in their half of the table once.

Top six

Bottom six

Top scorers

Source: SPL official website

Attendances
The average attendances for SPL clubs during the 2003/04 season are shown below:

 Source: SPL official website

Monthly awards

See also
2003–04 Celtic F.C. season
2003–04 Rangers F.C. season
2003–04 Dundee United F.C. season

References

Scottish Premier League seasons
1
Scot